The following lists events that happened during 1909 in the Republic of Chile.

Incumbents
President of Chile: Pedro Montt

Events 

24 June – The Everton de Viña del Mar football club is founded.

Births
15 May – Clara Solovera (d. 1992)
16 May – Raúl Rettig (d. 2000)
16 August – Bernardo Leighton (d. 1995)
24 October – Óscar Izurieta Molina (d. 1990)

Deaths 
4 January – Pedro Pablo Figueroa (b. 1857)
23 March – José Alfonso Cavada

References 

 
Years of the 20th century in Chile
Chile
1900s in Chile